Nicolas Edet (born 2 December 1987) is a French professional road cyclist, who currently rides for UCI WorldTeam . He has entered the Tour de France on eight occasions and completed the race seven times. He won the mountains classification in the 2013 Vuelta a España, and wore the red jersey of overall race leader, for one day, during the 2019 Vuelta a España.

Major results

2007
 8th Overall Tour du Faso
1st Stage 4
2008
 4th Paris–Tours Espoirs
2009
 4th Overall Rhône-Alpes Isère Tour
 10th Overall Giro della Valle d'Aosta
2010
 1st Stage 5 Giro della Valle d'Aosta
 3rd Overall Tour des Pays de Savoie
1st Stage 4
 3rd Overall Tour Alsace
2011
 1st  Mountains classification, Tour of Austria
 10th Overall Tour of Turkey
2012
 9th Overall Tour du Gévaudan Languedoc-Roussillon
  Combativity award Stage 1 Tour de France
2013
 Vuelta a España
1st  Mountains classification
 Combativity award Stage 4
 1st  Mountains classification, Rhône-Alpes Isère Tour
 4th Overall Tour of Turkey
 8th Prueba Villafranca de Ordizia
 9th Overall Tour of Austria
2014
 5th Overall Rhône-Alpes Isère Tour
1st Stage 3
 7th Grand Prix de la Ville de Lillers
2015
 1st  Mountains classification, Tour de Yorkshire
 6th Overall Tour du Limousin
 7th Overall Vuelta a Andalucía
 7th Overall Critérium International
 7th Cholet-Pays de Loire
2016
 1st  Sprints classification, Tour of the Basque Country
 3rd Overall Route du Sud
 4th Overall Tour du Limousin
 5th Tour du Doubs
 5th Grand Prix de Wallonie
 10th Overall Tour de Luxembourg
2017
 3rd Overall Tour du Gévaudan Languedoc-Roussillon
1st  Mountains classification
 4th Tour du Doubs
 5th Overall Tour La Provence
 9th Overall Tour de Luxembourg
2018
 1st  Overall Tour du Limousin
1st Stage 3
 2nd Overall Tour de l'Ain
 4th Tour du Finistère
2019
 5th Overall Tour du Haut Var
 10th Overall Tour de l'Ain
 10th Classic Sud-Ardèche
 Vuelta a España
Held  after Stage 8
2020
 1st  Mountains classification, Paris–Nice
 5th Overall Tour des Alpes-Maritimes et du Var
 5th Faun-Ardèche Classic
2022
 3rd Overall Vuelta a Asturias
 4th Overall Tour of Turkey
 9th Overall Route d'Occitanie

Grand Tour general classification results timeline

References

External links

Nicolas Edet profile at Cofidis

1987 births
Living people
French male cyclists
Sportspeople from Sarthe
Cyclists from Pays de la Loire